Jenny McLeod (born 1963) is a British playwright. McLeod grew up in Nottingham. She started writing plays in the middle of her A Levels after seeing an advertisement in a local paper. Her play Cricket at Camp  David won the Writing 87 workshop, and she went on to write Island Life for Monstrous Regiment Theatre Company. In 1991–2 she was writer-in-residence at the Nottingham Playhouse in 1991–1992. After winning a bursary from Thames Television, she was in residence at the Tricycle Theatre in 1995.

Island Life, first performed at the Nottingham Playhouse, pursued the stories of three women in an old people's home. In Raising Fires (1994), a West Indian orphan girl Tilda, brought to early-17th-century Essex by a minister, is accused of witchcraft. Poison (2000) was adapted to Britain from a South African musical version of Othello originally written and directed by David Kramer.

Plays

Performances
 Cricket at Camp David. Octagon Theatre, Bolton, 1988.
 Island Life. Monstroud Regiment Theatre Company, Nottingham Playhouse, 1988.
 The Mango Tree. Strange Fruit Theatre Company, 1990.
 Raising Fires. The Bush Theatre, London, 1994.
 The Wild at Heart Club. National Youth Theatre, 1995.
 Victor and the Ladies. Tricycle Theatre, 1995.
 It's You!. 1995.
 Poison. Tricycle Theatre, 2000.

Publications
 The Wake (TV) in Vicky Licorish and Philippa Giles, eds., Debut on Two BBC Books, 1990 
 Island Life, in Gillian Hanna, ed., Monstrous Regiment: A Collective Celebration, Nick Hern Books, 1991
 Raising Fires, in Bush Plays, 1993.

References

External links
 Black Plays Archive: Jenny McLeod
 Jenny McLeod (1963–)

1963 births
Living people
British women dramatists and playwrights
Black British women writers
People from Nottingham
20th-century British women writers
20th-century British dramatists and playwrights